Befetupitant (Ro67-5930) is a drug developed by Hoffmann-La Roche which acts as a potent and selective antagonist for the NK1 receptor. It was originally developed as a potential antiemetic drug, though development was ultimately discontinued after a related drug netupitant was deemed to be more suitable for clinical development. Befetupitant has however continued to be researched for other possible applications such as treatment of corneal neovascularization.

References 

NK1 receptor antagonists
Trifluoromethyl compounds